George Washington Noftsker (August 24, 1859 – May 8, 1931) was a 19th-century Major League Baseball player born in Shippensburg, Pennsylvania. He played in just one season, splitting time between the outfield and catcher for the  Altoona Mountain City of the Union Association. George had one base hit in 25 at bats for a .040 batting average in seven games played. George died in his hometown of Shippensburg at the age of 71 and is interred at Spring Hill Cemetery.

References

External links

1859 births
1931 deaths
Baseball players from Pennsylvania
Altoona Mountain Citys players
Major League Baseball right fielders
Major League Baseball catchers
19th-century baseball players
Chambersburg (minor league baseball) players
People from Shippensburg, Pennsylvania